Peire de Montagut  (? – 28 January 1232) was Grand Master of the Knights Templar from 1218 to 1232. He took part in the Fifth Crusade and was against the Sultan of Egypt's conditions for raising the siege of Damietta. He was previously Master of the Crown of Aragon.

Personal details
A close friend of William of Chartres, it was most likely the trust the previous Grand Master had in him which meant he himself was elected so quickly in 1218. At the same time, the Grand Master of the Knights Hospitaller was Guérin de Montaigu, who is likely to have been Pere's brother. The close relationship between the two military orders during this period was probably a result of this.

Military record
His actions against the Muslim forces working for the capture of Jerusalem were so effective, that they were forced to propose a surrender. In return for the Templars calling off their siege at Damietta, the Islamic forces would return many Frankish soldiers, halt attacks on Jerusalem and most importantly, return the part of the True Cross, captured from the Europeans at the Battle of Hattin.
Catholic pressure meant the Muslim terms were refused and the carnage continued. His military victories, aided by the Hospitaller knights, made him a renowned warrior.

He died in 1232 of apoplexy.

Notes

Grand Masters of the Knights Templar
Christians of the Fifth Crusade
1232 deaths